Manassery is a small town in Kozhikode district, located about 28 km east of Calicut city. Nearby places are Mukkam, Omassery, Mavoor, Chennamangallur, Kallanthode, Kettangal and Kunnamangalam.
KMCT Dental College   was established in this village in 2006.

Institutions
Gups Manassery established in 1908
KMCT School of Business (KSB) established in 2004
KMCT College of Teacher Education established in 2005 
School of Nursing, established in the year 2005 
KMCT Dental College  Established in 2006
Ayurveda Medical College was established in 2006 
National College of Pharmacy established in 1996 
KMCT MEDICAL COLLEGE established in the year 2008 
Villages in Kozhikode district
Kozhikode east